The Yue Festival is a live music festival featuring Chinese and international performers, in Shanghai, China.  The first annual Yue Festival took place on October 5, 2007, outdoors in Zhongshan Park.  Talents included Faithless, Talib Kweli, Ozomatli, Yacht, Banana Monkey, SuperVC, Hedgehog, IZ, Bananas Soundsystem, Dragontongue, Uprooted, and Redstar. 

A mini-Yue Festival took place at the Star Live in Beijing on October 2 and 3, 2007, with Faithless, Talib Kweli, and Ozomatli.

See also
 Midi Modern Music Festival
 Modern Sky Festival
 Chinese rock
 Beijing Jazz Festival
 Beijing Pop Festival

External links
 Yue Festival official website
  Split Works

Rock festivals in China